Terra Nova (Portuguese meaning "New Land") is a weekly newspaper that covers top stories from the island of São Vicente in the island country of Cape Verde. Terra Nova is headquartered in Mindelo, the nation's second largest city and is one of the most circulated newspapers and dailies in Cape Verde as well as the island of São Vicente. It was founded in 1975 making it one of the oldest newspapers that ever existed in the country or the archipelago.

Information
Terra Nova features sports, weather, businesses and more from the island as well as from Cape Verde. It features pages about news stories, newspaper pictures and sports online. It still remains to be one of the newspapers that is not linked to the World Wide Web.

See also

Newspapers in Cape Verde

Newspapers published in Cape Verde
Mass media in Mindelo
1975 establishments in Cape Verde